Norwalk Schools may refer to:
 Education in Norwalk, Connecticut
 Norwalk Community School District